Rfi Romania is the Romanian language radio service of Radio France Internationale. Unlike BBC Romanian, Rfi Romania has studios that cover most of the urban area of Romania and Moldova.

See also
Radio France Internationale

External links
RFI Romania
RFI Romania Facebook
Radio France Internationale

Romanian-language radio stations